Harry Manx (born 1955) is a Canadian musician who blends blues, folk music, and Hindustani classical music. His official website describes his music as being a "blend Indian folk melodies with slide guitar blues, add a sprinkle of gospel and some compelling grooves and you'll get Manx's unique "mysticssippi" flavour." Manx plays the slide guitar, harmonica, six-string banjo, mohan veena and Ellis stomp box. He studied for five years in India with Vishwa Mohan Bhatt. Bhatt is the inventor of the 20-stringed mohan veena, which has become Manx's signature instrument.
He has released twelve albums in twelve years, and has his own record label Dog My Cats Records.
He has received much recognition and many awards, including: seven Maple Blues Awards, six Juno nominations, the Canadian Folk Music Award in 2005 for Best Solo Artist, and CBC Radio’s "Great Canadian Blues Award" in 2007.

Manx was a nominee in the 8th Annual Independent Music Awards for his cover of Bruce Springsteen's "I'm on Fire".

Manx is a longtime collaborator with Canadian guitarist Kevin Breit and Australian keyboardist Clayton Doley.

Early years: Canada and Europe
Manx was born in 1955 in Douglas on the Isle of Man. His family moved to Ontario, Canada, when he was six years old. He started working with bands as a "roadie" at age 15 and gradually worked his way up to becoming the regular sound man at the well-known El Mocambo (Rock) club in Toronto. He left Toronto in the late 1970s, when he was 20, to return to Europe and started making money as a busker and also found work at festivals as a blues lapslide guitarist and songwriter. He then moved to Japan, where he lived and performed for 10 years.

Japan and India
In 1990, while Manx was in Japan, he heard a recording of the Indian slide guitarist Vishwa Mohan Bhatt. When Manx met Bhatt for the first time in Rajasthan, he had been living in another part of India for years. He became a student of Bhatt's and remained with him for five years. They travelled together in India and performed for large audiences.

Canada
In 2000, Manx moved back to Canada and set up residence in Saltspring Island, British Columbia and recorded his first Canadian album at the Barn Studios. This debut recording features 14 tracks of his one-man-band sound on the lap slide guitar, the Mohan Veena, the harmonica and vocals.

Family
Manx is married to Najma Manx, and together they have one son, Hector Oswald Manx. In a 2002 interview, in their house on Saltspring Island, Manx talked about the stresses of leaving his wife and son when on touring. "This guy here, he doesn’t care who I’m opening for," Harry said. "He just wants me home once in a while. It gets tough sometimes. We need to keep that connection all the time. We talk on the phone every day. You should see our phone bill."

Style
Manx's musical style has been called an "essential musical link" between the East and the West. His songs are "short stories that use the essence of the blues and the depth of Indian ragas to draw you in".

Discography

Solo and duo
 Dog My Cat (2001)
 Wise and Otherwise (2002)
 Jubilee (with Kevin Breit) (2003)
 Road Ragas (2003)
 West Eats Meet (2004)
 Mantras for Madmen (2005)
 In Good We Trust (with Kevin Breit) (2007)
 Live at the Glenn Gould Studio (2008)
 Bread and Buddha (2009)
 Isle of Manx (2010)
 Strictly Whatever (with Kevin Breit) (2011)
 Om Suite Ohm (2013)
 20 Strings and the Truth (2015)
 Faith Lift (2017)

Compilation inclusions
 Johnny's Blues: A Tribute To Johnny Cash (Northern Blues, 2003)
 Beautiful (A Tribute to Gordon Lightfoot) (Borealis Records, 2003)
Saturday Night Blues: 20 Years (CBC, 2006)
 Isle of Manx - the Desert Island Collection (2010)

References

External links

 Harry Manx official website
 Dog My Cat Records  Harry Manx's independent record label
 Youtube short documentary Manx describes his signature instrument; sings and play's Rueben's Train with it.

Living people
Canadian folk singer-songwriters
Manx emigrants to Canada
Manx musicians
1955 births
21st-century Manx musicians
Canadian Folk Music Award winners
Canadian male singer-songwriters
Stony Plain Records artists
21st-century Canadian male singers